Francesca "Frankie" Ingrassia is an American actress of Sicilian-Italian origin. Raised in Los Angeles, she is known for her role in Alexander Payne's Election.  Her first directed feature film is Vampire Dad which was released in June 2020.

Filmography 

 Secret Adventures (1993–1995) (V) .... Marcy
 The Positively True Adventures of the Alleged Texas Cheerleader-Murdering Mom (1993) (TV) .... Shanna Harper
 Terror in the Shadows (1995) (TV) .... Carolyn
 The X-Files (1 episode, "The Rain King", 1999) .... Cindy Culpepper (as Francesca Ingrassia)
 Election (1999) .... Lisa Flanagan
 Undressed (5 episodes, "#1.26", "#1.27", "#1.28", "#1.29" and "#1.30", 1999) .... Samantha
 Miss Supreme Queen (1999) .... Amber Ray Pruitt
 Glow (2000) .... Anna
 Malcolm in the Middle (1 episode, "Dinner Out", 2000) .... Becky (as Francesca Ingrassia)
 In Justice (1 episode, "Brothers and Sisters", 2006)  .... Lisa Debrizzi
 Marcus (2006) .... Brooke
 Without a Trace (1 episode, "Check Your Head", 2006) .... Bianca Stone (as Francesca Ingrassia)
 Random! Cartoons (1 episode, "Girls on the Go!", 2007)  .... Tess
 Skate. (2007) (VG) .... Female (voice)
 Under Still Waters (2008) .... Abigail
 Monk (2 episodes, "Mr. Monk and Mrs. Monk" and "Mr. Monk Is on the Run: Part 1", 2005 and 2008) .... Dr. Charles Kroger's Receptionist then Dr. Charles Kroger's Secretary
 Metalocalypse (1 episode, "Klokblocked", 2008)  .... Rachel
 Cold Case (1 episode, "The Dealer", 2008) .... Donna D'Amico '81
 The Mentalist (1 episode, "Red Sauce", 2009)  .... Gina
 Against the Wall (1 episode, 2011) .... Vicki 
 The Greening of Whitney Brown (2011) .... Interior Designer
 The Rum Diary (2011) .... Party girl (uncredited) 
 Metalocalypse (4 episodes, 2008-2012)
 Grey's Anatomy (1 episode 2013) .... Tyler's Mom
 Bones (1 episode, 2015) .... Hilary
 Goliath (5 episodes, 2016-2019) .... Frankie
 Colony (1 episode, 2017) .... Mother
 The Jellies (5 episodes, 2017-2019) 
 For the People (2019, 1 episode) .... Karen
 One Moment (2019) .... Fran

References

External links
 

American film actresses
American people of Italian descent
American television actresses
Living people
Year of birth missing (living people)
21st-century American women